Cape Lisburne LRRS Airport  is a military airport located on Cape Lisburne, at the northwest point of the Lisburne Peninsula in the North Slope Borough of the U.S. state of Alaska. The airport is owned by the U.S. Air Force. It is also known as Cape Lisburne Airport.

It is located within the Alaska Maritime National Wildlife Refuge in northwestern Alaska, between the Arctic Ocean and the Chuckchi Sea.

Overview
Cape Lisburne Airport is a United States Air Force military airstrip. Its mission is to provide access to the Cape Lisburne Long Range Radar Station (LRRS) for servicing and other requirements.

The airstrip was conducted in 1952 during the construction of the Cape Lisburne Air Force Station. During the station's operational use as a manned radar station, it provided transportation for station personnel and for supplies and equipment to be airlifted to the station. With the manned radar station's closure in 1983, the airstrip now provides access to the unattended site for maintenance personnel and other requirements.

It is not staffed by any support personnel, and is not open to the public. During the winter months, it may be inaccessible due to the extreme weather conditions at the location.

Facilities and aircraft 
Cape Lisburne LRRS Airport has one runway designated 8/26 with a gravel surface measuring 4,805 by 135 feet (1,465 x 41 m). For the 12-month period ending July 12, 1977, the airport had 200 general aviation aircraft operations, an average of 16 per month.

Airlines and destinations 
The following airlines offer scheduled passenger service at this airport:

Statistics

References

External links 
 Cape Lisburne (LIZ-1) page from The DEW LINE: Sites in Canada, Alaska and Greenland
 

Airports in North Slope Borough, Alaska
Chukchi Sea
Military installations in Alaska